Grevillea hislopii is a species of flowering plant in the family Proteaceae and is endemic to a restricted area of the south-west of Western Australia. It is a dense, single-stemmed shrub with linear to narrow elliptic leaves and clusters of hairy, whitish-grey flowers.

Description
The lower surface of the leaves is densely hairy.

Taxonomy
Grevillea hislopii was first formally described in 2008 by Peter M. Olde and Neil R. Marriott in the journal Nuytsia from specimens they collected near Perth in 2002.  The specific epithet (hislopii) honours Michael Clyde Hislop.

Distribution and habitat
This grevillea grows in open woodland near creeks and drainage lines in a small area west of York in the Jarrah Forest bioregion of south-western Western Australia.

Conservation status
Grevillea hislopii is listed as "Priority Two" by the Western Australian Government Department of Biodiversity, Conservation and Attractions, meaning that it is poorly known and from only one or a few locations.

See also
 List of Grevillea species

References

hislopii
Proteales of Australia
Eudicots of Western Australia
Plants described in 2008